The Stevens Treaties are a number of treaties signed by Governor Isaac Stevens for the United States, and Native American tribes in the then Washington Territory:

Treaty of Hellgate (1855)
Treaty of Medicine Creek (1854) 
Treaty of Neah Bay signed with the Makah (1855)
Treaty of Point Elliott (1855)
Point No Point Treaty (1855)
Quinault Treaty (1855 and 1856)
Treaty of Walla Walla (1855)